Osvaldo Budet (Juan Osvaldo Budet-Meléndez; born 1979 in San Juan, Puerto Rico) is a contemporary Puerto Rican artist. He is currently based in San Juan, Puerto Rico.

Education 
Budet received a B.F.A. in painting in 2004 from Escuela de Artes Plásticas de Puerto Rico and an M.F.A. in Painting from the Hoffberger School of Painting in 2008 at Maryland Institute College of Art (MICA). He was an artist in resident at Museo del Barrio Santurce, Puerto Rico in 2005 and in The Leipzig International Art Program, Germany in 2008.

Work
Budet's work is influenced by documentary film, and activism and his production of paintings, photographs and videos are characterized as being both,"Humorous and seriousness" The work displays a conscious of the problems of identity; a notion of the colonized is at the center of this work.

Budet constructs paintings and photographs which use self-portraiture to explore historical moments, often citing the creation of colonial identity. Budet uses reflective materials, such as diamond dust, iron oxide and glass to reference the material of film.  His work has been shown in Puerto Rico, New York City, Chicago, Los Angeles, Miami, Baltimore, Washington DC, Ireland and Italy.

References

External links 
 
 
 
 BBC Short Documentary about Osvaldo Budet
 Eigen+Art LAB
 MOLAA
 Walter Otero Artnet Gallery website
 Artnet Biography
  The Leipzig International Art Program
 Maryland institute College of Arts, MFA Thesis
 USA -vs- Juan Osvaldo Budet-Melendez Vieques Civil Disobedience Case
 El Status
  Chicago Art Magazine
 Art Talk Chicago
Publications
Painting Documentaries, Video Studio Visit

1979 births
Living people
People from San Juan, Puerto Rico
American contemporary painters
Puerto Rican painters
American emigrants to Germany
Maryland Institute College of Art alumni